Müllerberget is a mountain in Edgeøya, Svalbard. It has a height of 534 m.a.s.l., and is the highest bare summit of Edgeøya (while the Kvalpyntfonna glacier reaches higher). The mountain is named after German zoologist Johann Wilhelm von Müller.

References

Mountains of Edgeøya